First Love is a 1977 American romantic drama film starring William Katt and Susan Dey and directed by Joan Darling. The movie is based upon the 1957 short story Sentimental Education by Harold Brodkey. The original music score was composed by John Barry. However, much of his score was unused in favor of songs from Cat Stevens and Paul Williams, and material from Carmine Coppola and Jean Sibelius, resulting in Barry removing his name from the credits.

Plot
Elgin (William Katt) is a college student who spends much of his time studying literature and concentrating on his physical fitness by playing solitary soccer.  One day, he overhears his friend David (John Heard) making love next door.  He then hears David's girlfriend pounding on the door, demanding to know who's in his room with him.  Shelly (Beverly D'Angelo) comes into Elgin's  room wearing only a towel, implying she was the woman with David just a moment ago.  Shelly says she will only be there for a short time until David finishes making love with his girlfriend; but it takes a lot longer.  David thanks Elgin by setting him up with Shelly.

Elgin first sees Caroline (Susan Dey) during a meal. After the meal, Elgin and Shelly separate from David and his girlfriend, ending up in his room.  Shelly declares that she likes Elgin and offers to make love to him. When she disrobes, he is shocked and spurns her advances.

In a later scene, Elgin is working as the busboy at the school's cafeteria. There, he has his first conversation with Caroline but ends up spilling tea on her and her book.  She still leaves her dormitory name on a sheet of paper and he goes to see her with a new copy of the book.  After a rough start, she agrees to go and have coffee with him.  She alludes to having another boyfriend, but he is smitten and decides to join a class she is in, three weeks after it had started.  After talking to Caroline, Elgin learns that her father had died a long time ago.  They go on their first real date to the symphony and the chemistry between them becomes clear.

Caroline introduces Elgin to the other man, John (Robert Loggia), who is already married.  She is visibly shaken by this meeting and asks to spend a night with Elgin, because she doesn't want to be alone.  Their love making is interrupted by David who says Elgin is late for work.  Elgin runs to work and David convinces Caroline to take a ride back to her dorm on his motorcycle.  Elgin spots them together and he fights David in a jealous rage; but feels better when Caroline tells him that she's not interested in David.  Elgin gets fired for being late to work.

David and Caroline watch Elgin while he plays a successful game of soccer.  Elgin and Caroline were making love again when he asks about John (Robert Loggia), who worked with her father as a lawyer, and whom she had known all her life. He gets jealous after he learns that she slept with John, but Caroline gets mad about the entire conversation.  Elgin gets nervous when he can't get hold of her, but finds a note which tells him to join her, alone, at her family's estate.  Elgin meets Caroline and they pick up where they left off, but she resists him while they are in her childhood playhouse.  She told him that this is the place where her father committed suicide.  The phone rings before they drive together back to school.  During the drive, Caroline tells him that it was John on the phone. Caroline explains that John wants her back, and they can't see each other any more.  Elgin pulls his motorcycle out from the back of the car and leaves her on the side of the road alone in the car.  Elgin returns to his dorm to find Shelly sitting by his door. Shelly declares her love for David, but thinks he doesn't feel the same.  Elgin turns Shelly down for sex a second time.

Elgin runs into Caroline saying goodbye to John. She told Elgin that she's with John and it's over between them.  Elgin gets drunk and again finds Shelly at his door.  Elgin accepts Shelly's third proposition; but she leaves in the middle of their tryst when he calls her Caroline.  Elgin goes to Caroline's shared class, but leaves in the middle of the lecture when she doesn't show up.  Elgin then goes to see John at his office.  He professes his love to Caroline and asks John if his intentions are honorable.  John says he has a shaky marriage, but his kids are important and doesn't know if he can divorce his wife.  Caroline shows up in Elgin's room in the middle of the night, makes love to him, and then brings him breakfast in the morning.  John decides he won't get the divorce, but Elgin is mad that he's second best. Elgin runs into David at school and he tells him that he and Shelly are engaged. Elgin takes Caroline back, despite this fact.  This eventually tears him up inside and he tells Caroline his love for her is gone and their relationship is over. He says goodbye to her as she leaves him alone on a train.  He is shown back playing solitary soccer as the credits roll.

Main cast
 William Katt as Elgin Smith
 Susan Dey as Caroline Hedges
 John Heard as David Bonner
 Beverly D'Angelo as Shelley
 Robert Loggia as John March
 Swoosie Kurtz as Marsha
 Tom Lacy as Professor Oxton
 June Barrett as Felicia

Production
The film was shot on location in Portland, Oregon, including at Reed College and the Pittock Mansion.

Rating
In the United States, the film is rated R for its nudity and sexual content.

Reception
Janet Maslin of The New York Times found director Joan Darling "peculiarly misogynistic" in the way the two female lead characters "both pounce avariciously upon Mr. Katt, who seems passive and rather saintly under pressure ... Both Miss Hitchcock's script and Miss Darling's directing suggest that he is far too good for either lover."  Gene Siskel of the Chicago Tribune gave the film 2 stars out of 4 and called it "an in-and-out-of-love story with its characters' actions determined only by a writer's whimsy. You watch the picture and realize that the opposite of what is happening could be taking place and it would make just as much or little sense." Arthur D. Murphy of Variety wrote that Katt and Dey were both "excellent" but "an unfortunate element in the story is the never-ending pall of doom that hangs over everything ... where it should have been bittersweet, it's bland-gloomy." Charles Champlin of the Los Angeles Times stated that director Joan Darling "seems indeed to have a nice way with her performers, but some problems of script and casting defeat the film's obvious intentions and make what ought to have been a slight and tender work not only disappointing but actively unpleasant." K.C. Summers of The Washington Post wrote that the film "is the basically ho-hum story of a romance between an inexperienced college boy and a girl who's been around some. Everyone tries very hard, and there are a few feeble attempts at suspense, but the viewer never really gets involved enough to care how the affair ends up." David Ansen of Newsweek declared, "There is one good reason to see First Love, and his name is William Katt ... he manages to radiate sweetness without being cloying, ingenuousness without coyness and sexuality without narcissism." However, Ansen added, director Darling "hasn't quite mastered the transition from TV to screen; everything is staged up front, every emotion hit squarely on the head, and the result is a certain monotony of tone." Tom Milne of The Monthly Film Bulletin wrote, "Fulsomely cradled in slow motion and caressing dissolves, sprinkled with cultural references to Dante and idealistic philosophies, indulging much lachrymose drivel about first love and its irreparable loss, this Son of Love Story similarly tries to prove that the spirit of romance is not dead and proceeds to administer a cruel coup de grâce."

Michael Eisner of Paramount said the film did not lose money "but was not a success".

Home media
The film was released on VHS and DVD. It currently is available for streaming through some services.

References

External links

1977 romantic drama films
1977 films
American coming-of-age films
American romantic drama films
Films based on American novels
Films based on romance novels
Films set in Oregon
Films shot in Portland, Oregon
Films scored by John Barry (composer)
Paramount Pictures films
Reed College
1977 directorial debut films
1970s English-language films
1970s American films